Salvatore Antibo (born 7 February 1962) is a former long-distance runner from Italy.

He won nine medals at the International athletics competitions. but curiously, he never won national championship (not outdoor, not indoor).

Biography
Antibo was born on 7 February 1962 in Altofonte, within the province of Palermo (Sicily).

He revealed as a consistent middle-distance runner in the 1984 Summer Olympics in Los Angeles, when he arrived fourth in the 10,000 m final. His national popularity was however overshadowed by his compatriot Alberto Cova, who won the gold medal. After a bronze medal at the 1986 European Championships, behind Stefano Mei and again Cova, he gained the status of Italian number one, winning the silver medal over 10,000 m at the 1988 Summer Olympics in Seoul.

At the 1990 European Championships in Athletics in Split he was victorious over both 10,000 m and 5000 m, becoming one of the most popular sportsmen in his country. He was famous for his unorthodox tactics. In Split, he won the 10,000 m through front-running and the 5000 m with a sprint on the final straight.

In the 10,000 m final at the 1991 World Championships in Athletics in Tokyo, Antibo finished twentieth and last, losing to, for example, Moses Tanui, Richard Chelimo and Khalid Skah. He ran well during the first half of the race, but he slowed down radically during the second half (see, for example, "World Athletics Championships in Tokyo 1991" (Yleisurheilun MM-kisat Tokiossa 1991), The Runner magazine (Juoksija-lehti), Helsinki, 1991). It was eventually revealed that such sudden absences during the races were related to a form of epilepsy.

He retreated from professional athletics after his return from the 1992 Summer Olympics for a seizure in his last run.

National records
5000 metres: 13:05.59 ( Bologna, 18 July 1990) - 8 September 2020
10,000 metres: 27:16.50 ( Helsinki, 29 June 1989) - 6 October 2019

See also
Italian records in athletics
Italian all-time top lists - 5000 metres
Italian all-time top lists - 10000 metres
FIDAL Hall of Fame
Italy at the Athletics World Cup

References

External links
 
 
 Salvatore Antibo at FIDAL 
 
 

1962 births
Living people
People from Altofonte
Sportspeople from the Province of Palermo
Italian male long-distance runners
Athletes (track and field) at the 1984 Summer Olympics
Athletes (track and field) at the 1988 Summer Olympics
Athletes (track and field) at the 1992 Summer Olympics
Olympic athletes of Italy
World Athletics Championships athletes for Italy
Athletics competitors of Fiamme Oro
European Athletics Championships medalists
European athletics champions for Italy
Medalists at the 1988 Summer Olympics
Olympic silver medalists for Italy
Olympic silver medalists in athletics (track and field)